Patricia Honor Greene  (born 1931) is an English radio actress who is best known as matriarch Jill Archer (formerly nee Patterson) in radio serial The Archers. She has played the role continuously since 1957, making her the world's longest serving actor in a soap opera in any medium (radio, television or internet). Greene was briefly acted in television and film.

Biography
Greene was born in Allenton, Derby, England. Her family moved to Campion Street in the New Zealand part of the city, where she attended Ashgate Infants School on Ashbourne Road. Later she moved to Kirk Street, Chester Green, attending St Paul's Junior School and the Parkfields Cedars Grammar School.

After working as a ward orderly at the Derbyshire Children's Hospital and in the sheet metal factory of Hawk Industries, she decided to become an actress and went to the Royal Central School of Speech and Drama in London in 1951.

She has had a lengthy performing career and is best known for portraying matriarch Jill Archer in the BBC Radio 4 soap The Archers since 1957. She has also appeared in the TV series Casualty and Doctors both in 2000.

Personal life

Greene married English actor George Selway in 1959. They were later divorced and she married Cyril Austen Richardson in 1972, by whom had a son, Charles, born in 1972. She was widowed in 1986.

Honours
Greene was awarded the Order of the British Empire as an MBE in 1997 and was conferred an honorary Master of Arts degree by the University of Derby in 2017.

Filmography

Radio

Footnotes

External links
 Archers Characters
 

Living people
Alumni of the Royal Central School of Speech and Drama
English film actresses
English radio actresses
Members of the Order of the British Empire
People from Derby
Actresses from Derbyshire
The Archers
1931 births